Riot is a 2018 Australian television film about the LGBTI rights movement in the 1970s and the beginnings of the Sydney Gay and Lesbian Mardi Gras. It first screened on the ABC on 25 February 2018 and stars Damon Herriman as Lance Gowland.

Riot received the AACTA Award for Best Telefeature, Mini Series or Short Run Series in 2018.

References

External links

2018 television films
Australian television films
2018 films